XOne FifthX vs. Evergreen Terrace is a split EP by XOne FifthX and Evergreen Terrace. The album was released on May 20, 2003 through Indianola Records.

Track listing 

 Tracks 1-4 are by Evergreen Terrace; tracks 5-9 are by xOne Fifthx.

Personnel 
Evergreen Terrace
 Andrew Carey – unclean vocals
 Craig Chaney – guitar, clean vocals
 Josh James – guitar, backing vocals
 Jason Southwell – bass
 Christopher Brown – drums

References 

2003 EPs
Indianola Records EPs
Split EPs
Evergreen Terrace albums